Michael Thomas Blagrove (1934-2016), was a male athlete who competed for England.

Athletics career
He represented England in the 1 mile race at the 1958 British Empire and Commonwealth Games in Cardiff, Wales.

References

1934 births
2016 deaths
English male middle-distance runners
Athletes (track and field) at the 1958 British Empire and Commonwealth Games
Commonwealth Games competitors for England